Disney A to Z: The Official Encyclopedia is the official encyclopedia of The Walt Disney Company. It was written by Disney's head archivist, Dave Smith.

It has over five hundred pages of entries, hundreds of photographs, and provides coverage of the history of Disney, park attractions, television shows, songs, animated features and shorts, and films. It also includes details of Disney company personnel and primary actors.

Editions
 Disney A to Z: The Official Encyclopedia. 1st ed. New York: Hyperion, 1996. .
 Disney A to Z: The Updated Official Encyclopedia. Updated ed. New York: Hyperion, 1998. .
 Disney A to Z: The Official Encyclopedia. 3rd ed. New York: Disney Editions, 2006. .
 Disney A to Z: The Official Encyclopedia. 4th ed. New York: Disney Editions, 2006. .
 Disney A to Z (Fifth Edition) : The Official Encyclopedia. 5th edition Disney Editions, 2016 .

External links
  at D23.com

Hyperion Books books
Books about Disney
1996 books
Encyclopedias of fictional worlds
Disney fandom

20th-century encyclopedias